Branham station is a light rail station operated by Santa Clara Valley Transportation Authority (VTA). The station is served by the Blue Line of the VTA Light Rail system and is connected to the Highway 87 bikeway. Branham station is located in the median of State Route 87, near Branham Lane in San Jose, California. It was part of the original Guadalupe Line, the first segment of light rail from Santa Teresa to Tasman.

History 
Branham station is named after the closest cross street Branham Lane, which is named after San Jose pioneer Isaac Branham.

Future development 
As of 2021 VTA is holding planning meetings to consider converting the station's 3 acre "park and ride" parking lot into an office or housing development.

References

External links 

Santa Clara Valley Transportation Authority light rail stations
Railway stations in San Jose, California
Railway stations in the United States opened in 1987
1987 establishments in California
Railway stations in highway medians